Eva Wacanno (born 6 February 1991) is an inactive Dutch tennis player.

She has won two singles titles and 35 doubles titles on the ITF Circuit. On 14 December 2015, she reached her best singles ranking of world No. 407. On 16 April 2018, she peaked at No. 120 in the doubles rankings.

Wacanno made her WTA Tour debut at the 2014 Internationaux de Strasbourg, in the doubles event partnering Demi Schuurs, losing in the first round to the second seeds and eventual champions, Ashleigh Barty and Casey Dellacqua.

ITF Circuit finals

Singles: 8 (2–6)

Doubles: 53 (35–18)

External links
 
 

1991 births
Living people
Sportspeople from Weert
Dutch female tennis players
20th-century Dutch women
21st-century Dutch women